Poppy Seeds, released in 1971, was the second and final studio album from Vancouver, British Columbia band The Poppy Family. The album has yet to be released on modern formats and remains a rare vinyl. The tracks are available as part of the CD release of their first album however. 

Singles released from the album were "Where Evil Grows," "I Was Wondering," "No Good to Cry" (previously a minor 1966 hit by The Wildweeds), "Good Friends?," and "I'll See You There." "Where Evil Grows" was the album's biggest hit, reaching #6 in Canada and #45 in the United States.

Track listing

 "No Good to Cry" – 2:35 (Al Anderson)
 "Tryin'" – 3:03 (Terry Jacks)
 "Good Friends?" – 2:37 (Terry Jacks)
 "I Started Loving You Again" – 2:14 (Merle Haggard)
 "I'll See You There" – 3:17 (Terry Jacks)
 "I Was Wondering" – 3:00 (Terry Jacks)
 "Where Evil Grows" – 2:48 (Terry Jacks)
 "Living Too Close to the Ground" - 2:12 (T. Slater)
 "Someone Must Have Jumped" - 3:40 (Terry Jacks)
 "So Used to Loving You" - 1:59 (Sonny Curtis)
 "Remember the Rain" - 2:46 (Bob Lind)
 "Winter Milk" - 3:25 (Joe Fahrni)

Personnel
Susan Jacks: vocals, percussion
Terry Jacks: vocals
Brian Cavossa: Producer, mandolin, backup vocals

The Poppy Family albums
1971 albums
London Records albums